This is a list of notable events in country music that took place in the year 1922.

Events 
 June 30 – A.C. "Eck" Robertson became the first fiddler and country musician on record when he recorded eight tracks for the Victor Talking Machine Company in New York City.
 September 9 – First radio broadcast of Fiddlin' John Carson on WSB-Atlanta.

No dates

Top Hillbilly (Country) Recordings
The following songs were extracted from records included in Joel Whitburn's Pop Memories 1890-1954, record sales reported on the "Discography of American Historical Recordings" website, and other sources as specified. Numerical rankings are approximate.

Births 
 July 26 – Jim Foglesong, Music Row executive who helped lay foundation for country music's boom period in the 1970s through early 1990s. (died 2013)
 December 20 — Geoff Mack, Australian singer-songwriter (died 2017)

Deaths

See also
 1922 in music 
 List of years in country music

References

Further reading 
 Kingsbury, Paul, "Vinyl Hayride: Country Music Album Covers 1947–1989," Country Music Foundation, 2003
 Millard, Bob, "Country Music: 70 Years of America's Favorite Music," HarperCollins, New York, 1993
 Whitburn, Joel. "Top Country Songs 1944–2005 – 6th Edition." 2005.

Country
Country music by year